Coastline is an outdoor sculpture by American artist Jim Sanborn installed at the National Oceanic and Atmospheric Administration complex in Silver Spring, Maryland.

Coastline attempts to recreate the effect of waves crashing on the Atlantic coast (represented by rough-cut granite). This is achieved with artificial waves generated by a turbine and pneumatic blower underneath the sculpture. The wave frequency is controlled by a remote tide gauge in Woods Hole, Massachusetts, that sends actual wave heights to the sculpture's control mechanism in real time. Sanborn built a quarter-size scale model of the sculpture and consulted with a wave engineer while doing research for the project.

References

1993 establishments in Maryland
1993 sculptures
Buildings and structures in Silver Spring, Maryland
Downtown Silver Spring, Maryland
Granite sculptures in Maryland
National Oceanic and Atmospheric Administration
Outdoor sculptures in Maryland
Sculptures by Jim Sanborn
Water in art